Dey Brothers was a department store located in and around Syracuse, New York.

History
Dey's, a part of Allied Stores Co., was purchased by Campeau Corp. in 1986 and sold off in 1987 to May Company, the parent company of Dey's rival, Sibley's. The Addis Company and changed its name to Addis & Dey's. In 1991 
the company was merged with Sage-Allen stores to become Sage-Dey. The downtown store closed in 1992. All stores closed in 1993.

Location(s)
 Downtown - 401 S Salina St, Syracuse NY
 opened 1894, closed 1992
 now called "Dey's Plaza" - 45 upscale residential apartments being built, 17 completed and occupied (Oct 2010). An indoor local/organic foods and prepared foods market, Dey's Fresh Market, will open on the ground floor in Spring of 2011.
 Fairmount - 3529 W Genesee St, Syracuse NY
 opened 1966, closed 1994
 became home to the corporate offices in 1992 after closing of the downtown Syracuse store
 now Ashley Home Store 
 Baldwinsville Tri County Mall
 opened 1970's, closed 1992
 DeWitt - Shoppingtown Mall
 original location - opened 1954, moved to new expansion in 1991. Later Sears, which closed in 2018.
 new location - opened 1991, closed 1993. Became Kaufmann's, then Macy's. Vacant as of 2016.
 Clay Great Northern Mall
 opened 1989, closed 1993
 became Chappell's for a year, then Bon-Ton. Closed 2006, currently vacant. 
 Schenectady Mohawk Mall
 opened 1988 in former Boston Store location, closed 1993. Became Media Play. Demolished after property was redeveloped.
 Saratoga Springs Wilton Mall
 Opened 1990, closed 1993. Later Bon-Ton, which closed in 2018.

Defunct department stores based in New York State
Companies based in Syracuse, New York
Defunct companies based in New York (state)
Defunct companies based in Syracuse, New York
1877 establishments in New York (state)